Cladonia cornuta or the bighorn cup lichen is a species of fruticose, cup lichen in the family Cladoniaceae. It was first described as a new species by Swedish lichenologist Carl Linnaeus in his seminal 1753 work Species Plantarum. German biologist Georg Franz Hoffmann transferred it to the genus Cladonia in 1791. The lichen has a distribution that is circumpolar, boreal, and arctic. It has also been recorded from the Southern Hemisphere.

In North America, Cladonia cornuta is colloquially known as the bighorn Cladonia.

See also
 List of Cladonia species

References

cornuta
Lichen species
Lichens of Asia
Lichens of Europe
Lichens of North America
Lichens described in 1753
Taxa named by Carl Linnaeus
Lichens of the Arctic